The 1985 Georgia Southern Eagles football team represented the Georgia Southern Eagles of Georgia Southern College (now known as Georgia Southern University) during the 1985 NCAA Division I-AA football season. The Eagles played their home games at Paulson Stadium in Statesboro, Georgia. The team was coached by Erk Russell, in his fourth year as head coach for the Eagles.

Schedule

References

External links
 1985 Football Media Guide at gseagles.com

Georgia Southern
Georgia Southern Eagles football seasons
NCAA Division I Football Champions
Georgia Southern Eagles football